Gobuster is a software tool for brute forcing directories on web servers. It does not come preinstalled with Kali Linux.

See also 
 Nikto

References

External links 
 

Free security software
Computer security software